Against the Blade of Honour is a Hong Kong television series adapted from Gu Long's novel the moon scimitar book. The series was released overseas in June 1996 before airing on TVB Jade in July 1997 in Hong Kong.

Cast
 Note: Some of the characters' names are in Cantonese romanisation.

 Louis Koo as Ding Pang
 Noel Leung as Ching-ching
 Cheung Siu-fai as Lau Yeuk-chung
 Irene Wan as Chun Ho-ching
 Cheung Yik as Yam Tin-hang
 Lee Ying as Tse Siu-yuk
 Wong Wai as Tse Hiu-fung
 Mickey Chu as King Mo-ming
 Kwan Ching as Tse Sing
 Cheng Lui as Fong Ngo-tin

External links
Review at Spcnet.tv

1996 Hong Kong television series debuts
1997 Hong Kong television series endings
TVB dramas
Hong Kong wuxia television series
Television shows based on works by Gu Long
Cantonese-language television shows